King's Sutton is a village and civil parish in West Northamptonshire, Northamptonshire, England in the valley of the River Cherwell.

History

Early history
The village toponym means the King's south estate.

Coins from the 4th century AD have been recovered from the site.

The infant Saint Rumwold (or Rumwald, Rumbold or Rumbald) is said to have lived and died at King's Sutton in 662. Rumwold is said to have lived for only three days but professed his faith continuously during his life.

The English Civil War
The English Civil War helped develop Banbury’s then arms industry. The Royalist garrison was constantly at work early in 1645 digging saltpetre in King's Sutton and making gunpowder out of it in a house specially built near Banbury. Just over 10 years earlier a government saltpetreman had operated at Banbury for a year, having moved there from the then small market town of Coventry, before moving on to Hook Norton a short while  afterwards. King's Sutton was a local centre for saltpetre excavation and digging at the time.

Parish church
The oldest parts of the Church of England parish church of Saints Peter and Paul are the Norman font and largely Norman chancel. The north aisle was added in the 13th century and the south aisle early in the 14th century. The bell tower and most of the windows are Decorated Gothic. Sir Nikolaus Pevsner considered it "one of the finest, if not the finest, spire in this county of spires". The south porch, north aisle, west window and very fine east window of the chancel are Perpendicular Gothic.

Ss. Peter & Paul parish is now part of a single Church of England benefice with the adjacent parish of Newbottle and Charlton.

Other notable buildings
The Court House was built in about 1500, partly of stone and partly timber-framed. It was altered in the 16th and 18th centuries.

The manor house was built in the middle of the 17th century.

Astrop House

It is constructed of limestone ashlar in two storeys with a 7-bay frontage 

It was built c.1740 for Sir John Willes, Chief Justice of the Court of Common Pleas. Sir John Soane added wings for the Revd. William Shippen Willes, which were extended in the 19th century and demolished in 1961. William Wilkinson added the Keeper's lodge, pheasantry and a cottage in 1868. Lancelot "Capability" Brown laid out the grounds.

Astrop was the site of a famous Spa discovered in the 17th century. All that now remains is a small well known as St. Rumbald's Well, south of the house in a valley (see "History" section).

Transport
The Great Western Railway had taken the line over by the time it opened, and in 1872 the GWR opened King's Sutton railway station for the village.

Governance
The village has a parish council with 15 members.

Heritage Trust
King's Sutton Heritage Trust Fund was formed in December 2005 with a Mission Statement which reads 'To promote, protect and enhance the history, facilities, structures, and amenities of the village of King's Sutton and the surrounding area for the benefit of its inhabitants.

Notable residents
Olga Kevelos, motorcycle racer, was landlady of The Three Tuns in King's Sutton for a number of years.
Arthur Halestrap, one of the last surviving British soldiers of the First World War, lived and died in the village.

Amenities

Kings Sutton Primary School is in Richmond Street. It celebrated its centenary in 2008. Its last Ofsted report was in 2010 and gave the school grade 2, stating: "This is a good school. The new headteacher provides focused leadership so that all the staff are supporting the good quality of education for the pupils." The school used to be in Astrop Road and those premises are now a private house. Kings Sutton has also a pre-school.

King's Sutton has two public houses: The Butchers Arms (Hook Norton Brewery), and The White Horse.

There is a lawn tennis club.

See also
 Banburyshire
 History of Banbury

References

Further reading

Gallery

External links

 King’s Sutton website

Villages in Northamptonshire
Country houses in Northamptonshire
History of Northamptonshire
Tourist attractions in Northamptonshire
Gardens by Capability Brown
West Northamptonshire District